Pierre-De Saurel is a regional county municipality  in the Montérégie region in southwestern Quebec, Canada. Originally named Le Bas-Richelieu Regional County Municipality, the name change to Pierre-De Saurel took effect on January 1, 2009. Its seat is in Sorel-Tracy. It is located on the Richelieu River, downstream from La Vallée-du-Richelieu Regional County Municipality at the confluence of the Richelieu and Saint Lawrence River.

The RCM is named after Pierre de Saurel, a captain and seigneur who rebuilt Fort Richelieu in 1647.

Subdivisions
There are 12 subdivisions within the RCM:

Cities & Towns (3)
 Saint-Joseph-de-Sorel
 Saint-Ours
 Sorel-Tracy

Municipalities (7)
 Saint-Aimé
 Saint-David
 Saint-Robert
 Saint-Roch-de-Richelieu
 Sainte-Anne-de-Sorel
 Sainte-Victoire-de-Sorel
 Yamaska

Parishes (1)
 Saint-Gérard-Majella

Villages (1)
 Massueville

Demographics

Population

Language

Transportation

Access routes
Highways and numbered routes that run through the municipality, including external routes that start or finish at the county border:

 Autoroutes
 

 Principal highways
 
 
 

 Secondary highways
 
 
 

 External routes
 None

See also
 List of regional county municipalities and equivalent territories in Quebec

References

External links
 SorelTracyRegion.net, official web-portal for the region

 
Census divisions of Quebec
1982 establishments in Quebec